María José Pérez González (born 19 March 1984) is a Spanish footballer who plays for Granadilla Tenerife Sur of Spain's Primera División. She has also played for the Spain national team.

Club career
Pérez played most of her career with teams based in the Canary Islands. In 2015, she achieved promotion to the Primera División with Granadilla. In 2016, Pérez left the archipelago to sign for Levante UD.

Personal life
The Leicester City footballer Ayoze Pérez is her cousin.

Honours
Copa de la Reina de Fútbol (1): 2003

References

External links
    
 
 Profile at La Liga 

1984 births
Living people
Footballers from Santa Cruz de Tenerife
Spanish women's footballers
Spain women's international footballers
Primera División (women) players
CE Sabadell Femení players
Levante UD Femenino players
UD Granadilla Tenerife players
Women's association football forwards
Spain women's youth international footballers
21st-century Spanish women